The Communist Party of Ecuador – Red Sun (PCE-SR), also known as  (Quechua for "Red Sun") is a small Marxist–Leninist–Maoist guerrilla group in Ecuador. It was founded on 1 June 1993. From inception, until their death, the group's former leader used the nom de guerre "Comrade Joselo". Joselo died on November 6th, 2022 with no announcement of a successor. The PCE-SR consists mostly of former members of the underground leftist group  The organization follows the ideas of the Peruvian communist leader Abimael Guzmán, founder and longtime chairman of the Communist Party of Peru – Shining Path.

The group has protested for workers' rights, and against increased bureaucratic policing and government displacement of communities from economic infrastructure such as mining. Taking inspiration from the Shining Path, PCE-SR advocates for the peasant seizure of farmlands, electoral boycotting, and violence against state institutions.

References

External links
 Official website
 PCE-SR communiqués

Communist militant groups
Communist parties in Ecuador
Guerrilla movements in Latin America
Paramilitary organisations based in Ecuador
Maoist parties
Maoism in South America